Oscar Arango (born 30 August 1965) is a Colombian fencer. He competed in the team épée event at the 1988 Summer Olympics.

References

1965 births
Living people
Colombian male épée fencers
Olympic fencers of Colombia
Fencers at the 1988 Summer Olympics
Pan American Games medalists in fencing
Pan American Games silver medalists for Colombia
Fencers at the 1991 Pan American Games
20th-century Colombian people
21st-century Colombian people